{{DISPLAYTITLE:C9H8O}}
The molecular formula C9H8O may refer to:

 Acrylophenone, an organic compound
 Benzopyran, a polycyclic organic compound
 Cinnamaldehyde, an organic compound with the formula C6H5CH=CHCHO
 1-Indanone, the organic compound with the formula C6H4(CH2)2CO